A list of Bangladeshi films released in 1986.

Releases

References

See also

1986 in Bangladesh
List of Bangladeshi films of 1987
List of Bangladeshi films
Cinema of Bangladesh

Film
Lists of 1986 films by country or language
 1986